The Hnilec) is a river in Slovakia. Its source is located below the Kráľova hoľa mountain, Low Tatras. It flows into the Hornád river near Margecany. The Palcmanská Maša dam is located on the river near Dobšiná. Places of interest along the river include Dobšiná Ice Cave and the Slovak Paradise.

References

Rivers of Slovakia
Spiš